At a minimum, a screw drive is a set of shaped cavities and protrusions on the screw head that allows torque to be applied to it. Usually, it also involves a mating tool, such as a screwdriver, that is used to turn it. The following heads are categorized based on frequency, with some of the less-common drives being classified as "tamper-resistant".

Most heads come in a range of sizes, typically distinguished by a number, such as "Phillips #00". These sizes do not necessarily describe a particular dimension of the drive shape, but rather are arbitrary designations.

Slotted drives

Slot 
 Slot screw drives have a single horizontal indentation (the slot) in the fastener head and is driven by a "common blade" or flat-bladed screwdriver. This form was the first type of screw drive to be developed, and for centuries, it was the simplest and cheapest to make. Additionally, it is unique because the slot head is straightforward to manufacture, and because it can be driven by a simple handtool. The slotted screw is commonly found in existing products and installations, along with use in simple carpentry work and in applications where minimal torque is needed. Slot screws are also used in the restoration of antique furniture, vehicles, and equipment.

However, this design is not well-suited for installation by power tools, given that a power driver often slips out of the slot; this often causes damage to the screw and surrounding material. For this reason, cruciform-slotted along with drives have replaced the slot drive in numerous applications. The tool used to drive a slot is called a common blade, flat-blade, slot-head, flat-tip or flat-head / flathead screwdriver. A hollow-ground screwdriver is less likely to cam out (leave the slot due to the torque being translated into an axial force, similar to that encountered with Phillips drive but dependent only on driver blade), so more torque can be applied without damaging the screw head. Flat-blade jeweler's screwdrivers and the tips found in  drive sets are generally hollow-ground. Note that it is this typical chisel shape which allows 9 screwdriver sizes to drive 24 different slotted screw sizes, with the drawbacks of not fitting as closely as a hollow-ground screwdriver would, and increasing the possibility of damaging the fastener or surrounding area.

ISO 2380-1 specifies the internationally standardized shape and dimensions of the tips of screwdrivers for slotted-head screws as well as the minimum test torque the blade-to-handle connection shall withstand. Screwdriver tips are generally designated by blade thickness × width in mm, e.g. 1.2 × 6.5 which roughly matches a classic North American 1/4" screwdriver although the North American one is often a bit thinner (~1.0 mm).

At least one mechanical method of temporarily holding a slotted screw to a matching screwdriver is available, the Quick-Wedge screw-holding screwdriver, first manufactured by the Kedman Company in the 1950s.

Dzus fasteners, which have a cam-lock body instead of a threaded body, use a slot drive.

Coin-slot 
 Coin-slot drives are so-called because of the curved bottom of the recess, which facilitates driving them with a suitable coin. They are often used on items where the user is not likely to have a screwdriver when needed, such as recessed screws that attach cameras to tripod adapters, and battery compartments in some equipment such as children's toys.

Hi-Torque 
 Hi-Torque slot drives were designed by Alcoa Fastening Systems, for situations where very high torque is needed, along with the ability to repeatedly install and remove the fastener. The design features curved walls, unlike the straight-walled slot drive.

The Type II (Conical/Connie) design adds a conical cup that receives a centering pin on the driver, improving the alignment of the driving tool to the fastener recess.

Cross 
 A cross or double-slot screw drive has two slots, oriented perpendicular to each other, in the fastener head; a slotted screwdriver is still used to drive just one of the slots. The advantage is that they provide some measure of redundancy: should one slot be deformed in service, the second may still be used.

Cruciform drives 
The following are screw drives based on a cruciform shape; i.e., a cross shape. Other names for these types of drives are cross recessed, cross-head, cross tip, and cross-point. A double slotted screw drive is not considered cruciform because the shape is not recessed, and consists only of two superimposed simple milled slots. Some of these types are specified in ISO 4757, Cross recesses for screws.

Phillips 

 The Phillips screw drive (specified as an ANSI Type I Cross Recess and type H in ISO documentation) was created by John P. Thompson, who, after failing to interest manufacturers, sold his design to businessman Henry F. Phillips. Phillips is credited with forming a company (Phillips Screw Company), improving the design, and promoting the adoption of his product. The original 1932 patent expired in 1966, but the Phillips Screw Company continued to develop improved designs.

The American Screw Company of Providence, Rhode Island, was responsible for devising a means of efficiently manufacturing the screw, and successfully patented and licensed their method; other screw makers of the 1930s dismissed the Phillips concept because it called for a relatively complex recessed socket shape in the head of the screw, as distinct from the simple milled slot of a slotted screw. The Phillips screw design was developed as a direct solution to several problems with slotted screws: high cam out potential; need for precise alignment to avoid slippage and damage to driver, fastener, and adjacent surfaces; and difficulty of driving with powered tools.

Phillips drive bits are often designated by the letters "PH", plus a size code 0000, 000, 00, 0, 1, 2, 3, or 4 (in order of increasing size); the numerical bit size codes do not necessarily correspond to nominal screw size numbers.

A Phillips screw head is slightly different from a PoziDriv; see  section below for details.

The design is often criticized for its tendency to cam out at lower torque levels than other "cross head" designs. There has long been a popular belief that this was a deliberate feature of the design, to assemble aluminium aircraft without overtightening the fasteners. Extensive evidence is lacking for this specific narrative, and the feature is not mentioned in the original patents. However, a 1949 refinement to the original design described in US Patent #2,474,994 describes this feature.

Pozidriv 

 The Pozidriv, sometimes incorrectly spelled "Pozidrive", is an improved version of the Phillips screw drive. It is designated "Type IA" by ANSI standards. and "Type Z" in ISO documents. The Pozidriv was patented by GKN Screws and Fasteners in 1962. It was designed to allow more torque to be applied and greater engagement than Phillips drives. As a result, the Pozidriv is less likely to cam out. It is similar to, and compatible with, the Supadriv screw drive.

Pozidriv screwdrivers are often designated using the letters "PZ" followed by a size code of 0, 1, 2, 3, 4 or 5 (in order of increasing size). The numbers do not correspond to nominal screw size numbers. PZ1 is normally used on screw diameters from 2-3mm, PZ2 from 3.5-5mm and PZ3 from 5.5mm to 8mm. These sizes roughly correspond to the Phillips head numbers.

Pozidriv screws have a set of radial indentations (tick marks) set at 45° from the main cross recess on the head of the screw, which makes them visually distinct from Phillips screws.

While a Phillips screwdriver has slightly tapered flanks, a pointed tip, and rounded corners, a Pozidriv screwdriver has parallel flanks, a blunt tip, and additional smaller ribs at 45° to the main slots. The manufacturing process for Pozidriv screwdriver bits requires a slightly more complex cutter than that for Phillips, however both can be manufactured in four cuts from a tapered blank.

Pozidriv and Phillips appear broadly interchangeable, but may cause damage if incorrectly used. Pozidriv screwdrivers will jam fit into Phillips screws, but when tightened they may slip or tear out the Phillips screw head. Conversely, while Phillips screwdrivers will loosely fit and turn Pozidriv screws, they will cam out if enough torque is applied, potentially damaging the screw head or screwdriver.

JIS B 1012 

 The JIS B 1012 is commonly found in Japanese made equipment, such as cameras and motorbikes. Superficially it looks like a Phillips screw with narrower and more vertical slots, to give less tendency to cam out. The bottom of the recess is flat, and the point of the driver has to be blunt. A Phillips screwdriver has the same 26.5 degree cone angle but because of the tapered slots will not seat fully, and will damage the screw if forced.
A correctly sized JIS driver will engage at full depth into a Phillips or Pozidriv head screw slightly loosely, but without damage. JIS heads are often identified by a single dot or an "X" to one side of the cross slot.

"JIS" standardized cruciform-blade screwdrivers are available for this type of screw, and should always be used to avoid head and driver damage.

Supadriv 

 The Supadriv (sometimes spelled incorrectly as "Supadrive") screw drive is very similar in function and appearance to Pozidriv. It is a later development by the same company. The description of the Pozidriv head applies also to Supadriv. While each has its own driver, the same screwdriver heads may be used for both types without damage; for most purposes it is unnecessary to distinguish between the two drives. Pozidriv and Supadriv screws are slightly different in detail; the later Supadriv allows a small angular offset between the screw and the screwdriver, while Pozidriv has to be directly in line.

In detail, the Supadriv screwhead is similar to Pozidriv but has only two identification ticks, and the secondary blades are larger. Drive blades are about equal thickness. The main practical difference is in driving screws into vertical surfaces:  that close to a near-vertical surface to drive the screws into the drivers, Supadriv has superior bite, making screwdriving more efficient, with less cam out.

Phillips II 
 Phillips II recesses are compatible with Phillips drivers, but have a vertical rib in between the cruciform recesses that interacts with horizontal ribs on a Phillips II driver to create a stick-fit, and to provide anti cam-out properties (the ribs are trademarked as "ACR" for Anti Cam-out Ribs).

Frearson 

 The Frearson screw drive, also known as the Reed and Prince screw drive, and specified as ANSI Type II Cross Recess, is similar to a Phillips but the Frearson has a sharp tip and larger angle in the V shape. One advantage over the Phillips drive is that one driver or bit fits all screw sizes. It is often found in marine hardware and requires a Frearson screwdriver or bit to work properly. The tool recess is a perfect, sharp cross, allowing for higher applied torque, unlike the rounded, tapered Phillips head, which can cam out at high torque. It was developed by an English inventor named Frearson in the 19th century and produced from the late 1930s to the mid-1970s. The Reed & Prince Mfg. Company of Worcester, Massachusetts, was put into bankruptcy in 1987 and liquidated in 1990. Another entity called Reed & Prince Manufacturing Corporation, now of Leominster, Massachusetts, purchased some of the assets including the name at the liquidation sale.

As of 2022, both Frearson screws and Frearson bits are readily available in several sizes. The available screws are made of silicon bronze.

French recess 

 Also called BNAE NFL22-070 after its Bureau de normalisation de l'aéronautique et de l'espace standard number. A cross-head screw with a two-step driver design, with the blade diameter stepping up at a distance from the point.

Mortorq 
 The Mortorq drive, developed by the Phillips Screw Company, is a format used in automotive and aerospace applications. It is designed to be a lightweight, low-profile and high-strength drive, with full contact over the entire recess wing, reducing risk of stripping. This low recess was able to create a shorter head height compared to other screws at the time of its development.  This shorter head height was able to reduce the weight of this drive type.  The Mortorq was originally designed for aerospace applications.  This reduction of weight within the head height was able to create lighter assemblies for many aerospace projects.  The materials used in aerospace applications are expensive, and the reduction of weight cuts down on the cost of production of these parts.  This will allow thinner materials to be used for the screws.  The shorter head height allows more "Clearance for internal parts and more design flexibility".  This allows the Mortorq drive to work in smaller and more complex builds.

Design and Application
The recess and driver were designed for "full radial contact along all four wings of the screw" which helps to prevent stripping and cam-out.  The straight walls in the design of the recess allow for almost all of the force of rotation to be used to drive the screw.  When the bit is placed in the recess there is no wall contact until the driver is rotated, then there is full continuous contact to all four walls of the recess.  The shallow recess allows for build-up and coating to occur without affecting the function of the driver.  This shallow recess also grants off-angle drivability to allow work in hard-to-reach places.  The design of the recess and shorter head height allows for more aesthetically pleasing work.  This is in hopes that it will enhance the beauty and style of a product.  Instead of covering up the screw head that it serves as an aesthetic part of the design.  Ten different recess sizes are available for the Mortorq.  The smallest of these, the PMT-000 can be used with screws that have a head diameter as small as 2.5mm.  While the largest called PMT-7 can be used on screws with a head diameter of 35mm.

Quality Assurance
The Phillips Screw Company owns the licensed product that is the Mortorq spiral drive system.  The Phillips Screw Company must inspect and approve any punches, bits, and screws before they are cleared for production.  Along with this "all licensees must submit samples regularly to ensure that the strict quality standards are maintained".  Solid modeling is used for the design of the punches, bits, and screws.  Files are sent over to manufacturers containing these models so that there is no miscommunication and all the parts are the same across the board.  For the Phillips Screw Company, consistency is key.

Square drives

Robertson 

 A Robertson screw, also known as a square or Scrulox screw drive, is specified as ANSI Type III Square Center and has a square-shaped socket in the screw head and a square protrusion on the tool. Both the tool and the socket have a slight taper. Originally to make the manufacture of the screws practical using cold forming of the heads, this taper provides two other advantages which have served to popularize the drive: it makes inserting the tool easier, and tends to help keep the screw on the tool tip without the user needing to hold it there.

Robertson screws are commonplace in Canada, though they have been used elsewhere and have become much more common in other countries. As patents expired and awareness of their advantages spread, Robertson fasteners have become popular in woodworking and in general construction. Combinations of Robertson/Phillips/slot drives are often used in the electrical trade, particularly for device and circuit breaker terminals, as well as clamp connectors.

Robertson screwdrivers are easy to use one-handed, because the tapered socket tends to retain the screw, even if it is shaken. They also allow for the use of angled screw drivers and trim head screws. The socket-headed Robertson screws reduce cam out, stop a power tool when set, and can be removed if painted over or old and rusty. In industry, they speed up production and reduce product damage.

Multiple-square drives

LOX-Recess 

 The LOX-Recess screw drive was invented by Brad Wagner, and fasteners using it are distributed by licensees Hitachi, Dietrick Metal Framing, and Grabber. The design is four overlapping square recesses, with 12 contact points, and is designed to increase torque, decrease wear, and avoid cam-out.

Double-square 
 The double-square drive is two squares superimposed at 45° rotation, forming an 8-pointed star. The design is similar to a square drive (Robertson), but can be engaged at more frequent angles by the driver bit.

Triple-square (XZN) 

 The triple-square, also known as XZN, is a type of screw drive with 12 equally spaced protrusions, each ending in a 90° internal angle.    The name derives from overlaying three equal squares to form such a pattern with 12 right-angled protrusions (a 12-pointed star). In other words, three Robertson squares are superimposed at a successive 30° rotation. The design is similar to that of the double-square—in both cases, the idea being that it resembles a square (Robertson) but can be engaged at more frequent angles by the driver bit.  These screws can be driven with standard Robertson bits.

Sizes are M4, M5, M6, M8, M9, M10, M12, M14, M16, and M18. Despite the similar naming scheme to metric fasteners, there is no correlation between the name of the size and the dimensions of the tool.

The 12-pointed internal star shape superficially resembles the "double hex" fastener head, but differs subtly in that the points are shaped to an internal angle of 90° (derived from a square), rather than the 120° internal angle of a hexagon. In practice, drivers for the fasteners may be interchangeable, but should be examined carefully for proper fit before application of force. A hex key should not be used where a key of square cross-section is the correct fit.

Triple-square fasteners are referred to as "spline" in the UK.  This is potentially confusing if looking for the more unusual 12-spline flange type.  While they are distinguished under close inspection by the angle at the tip of each of the 12 points (with a 90° angle on the XZN, instead of 60°) the general similarity and ability to insert the wrong tool can cause damage to the head.

Triple-square drive fasteners have been used in high-torque applications, such as cylinder head bolts and drive train components. The fasteners involved have heads that are hardened and tempered to withstand the driving torque without destroying the star points. They are commonly found on German vehicles such as BMW, Opel, Mercedes, and those from the Volkswagen Group (Porsche, Audi, Seat, Skoda, and Volkswagen).

Internal hex drives

Hex socket 

 The hex socket screw drive has a hexagonal recess and may be driven by a hex wrench, also known as an Allen wrench, Allen key, hex key, or inbus as well as by a hex screwdriver (also known as a hex driver) or bit. Tamper-resistant versions with a pin in the recess are available. Metric sizes of the hex socket are defined by ISO 4762 (socket head cap screws), ISO 4026 (socket set screws with flat point), ISO 4027 (socket set screws with cone point), ISO 4028 (socket set screws with dog point), and ISO 4029 (socket set screws with cup point).

The German company Bauer & Schaurte patented the hex socket 1936 in Germany, and marketed products based on it. The term "inbus" is derived from Innensechskant Bauer u. Schaurte (German: "Inner 6-edge Bauer & Schaurte"), analogous to the US term "Allen key". In many countries it is commonly but incorrectly called "imbus". .  In Denmark the format is generally called .

Double hex 
 Double hex is a screw drive with a socket shaped as two coaxial offset hex recesses; it can be driven by standard hex key tools. The shape resembles triple square and spline screw drives, but they are incompatible.

The radial "height" of each arris is reduced, compared to a six-point, although their number is doubled. They are potentially capable of allowing more torque than a six-point, but greater demands are placed on the metallurgy of the heads and the tools used, to avoid rounding off and slippage.

The shape of a double hex head is equivalent to that of a 2{6} regular dodecagram.

Pentalobular sockets

Pentalobe 
 The pentalobe screw drive is a five-pointed tamper-resistant system  implemented by Apple in its products. Apple's first use of the pentalobe drive was in mid-2009 to secure the battery in the MacBook Pro. Smaller versions are now used on the iPhone 4 and subsequent models, the MacBook Air (since the late 2010 model), the MacBook Pro with Retina Display and the 2015 MacBook. Pentalobe screw sizes include TS1 (also known as P2 or 0.8 mm, used on the iPhone 4 and subsequent models), TS4 (also known as P5 or 1.2 mm, used on the MacBook Air [since late 2010], the MacBook Pro with Retina Display and the 2015 MacBook) and TS5 (also known as P6 or 1.5 mm, used on the 2009 MacBook Pro battery). The TS designation is ambiguous as it is also used for a Torq-set screw drive.

ASTER recess 
 The ASTER recess was designed by LISI Aerospace to provide a more reliable solution than the hexagonal recess for assemblies of composite structures on aircraft. This recess is optimized to fit on the threaded end of aerospace fasteners. These fasteners allow for tightening the nut and holding the bolt simultaneously, on the same side of the structure, by only one operator.

Hexalobular (Torx)

Torx 
 The hexalobular socket screw drive, often referred to by the original proprietary brand name Torx or by the alternative generic name star drive, uses a star-shaped recess in the fastener with six rounded points. It was designed to permit increased torque transfer from the driver to the bit compared to other drive systems. The drive was developed in 1967 by Camcar Textron. Torx is very popular in the automotive and electronics industries because of resistance to cam out, and extended bit life, as well as reduced operator fatigue by minimizing the need to bear down on the drive tool to prevent cam out. A tamper-resistant Security Torx head has a small pin inside the recess. Owing to its six-fold symmetry, a Torx driver can also be used as an improvised substitute for a hex driver, although careful sizing is critical to prevent stripping the socket.

Torx Plus 
 Torx Plus is an improved version of Torx that extends tool life even further and permits greater torque transfer compared to Torx. An External Torx version exists, where the screw head has the shape of a Torx screwdriver bit, and a Torx socket is used to drive it.

Torx Plus Tamper-Resistant 
 The tamper-resistant variant of Torx Plus, sometimes called Torx Plus Security, is a five-lobed variant, with a center post. It is used for security as the drivers are uncommon.

Torx Paralobe 
 Torx Paralobe is a further improvement over Torx Plus, claiming 50% increased drive system torque over Torx and 20% over Torx Plus.

Torx ttap 
 Torx ttap is a version of Torx that reduces wobbling between the fastener and the tool, and is backward compatible with standard hexalobular tools.

Spline socket 

 The spline socket (alternatively known as Bristo, Bristol, Bristol spline, multiple-spline and fluted) screw drive features four or six splines. Almost all of the force of the key or driver is applied normal to the sides of the splines. Little force tending to expand the socket is exerted, unlike the hexagon socket design, making the spline socket preferable for fasteners made of lower strength materials and in setscrews due to reduced tendency of the setscrew to bind. The spline socket is also preferred over the hexagon socket in screws that must be subjected to high driving torque and in applications requiring high reliability of the fastener. Compared to the hexagon socket drive, spline socket drives are less likely to strip for the same amount of torque; however, the spline socket drive is not much more strip-resistant than a Torx drive.

As a makeshift if the correct spline key is not available, a spline socket screw can be turned with any screwdriver designed to drive slotted screws that fits into the socket such that the width of the blade occupies the major diameter of the socket and the thickness of the blade permits it to fit between adjacent splines. This makeshift does not permit as much torque to be applied to the screw as can be applied with the correct spline key, due to concentration of stress that can damage the socket or screwdriver.

The spline socket drive system was patented in the United States in 1913 by Dwight S. Goodwin and initially produced by the Goodwin Hollow Set Screw Company. Spline socket screws are used in avionics, high reliability applications, cameras, air brakes, construction and farm equipment and astronomy equipment.

Combination drives 

Some screws have heads designed to accommodate more than one kind of driver, sometimes referred to as combo-head or combi-head. The most common of these are a combination of a slotted/Phillips head.

Other combinations are a Phillips and Robertson, a Robertson and a slotted, a Torx and a slotted and a triple-drive screw that can take a slotted, Phillips or a Robertson.

Slotted/Phillips 
 The Slotted/Phillips head is often used in attaching knobs to furniture drawer fronts and combined slotted/pozidriv heads are so ubiquitous in electrical switchgear to have earned the nickname "electrician's screws". (The idea is that first screwdriver out of the toolbox is used, and the user does not have to waste valuable time searching for the correct driver). Slotted/Phillips (as opposed to slotted/pozidriv) heads occur in some North American-made switchgear.
Their rise to popular use has been in spite of the fact that the head is weaker and neither a flat screwdriver nor a Pozidriv/Phillips screwdriver as appropriate is fully successful in driving these screws to the required torque. Some screwdriver manufacturers solve this problem offer matching screwdrivers and call them "Modulo", "plus-minus", or "contractor screwdrivers", although the original concept of not needing to search for a particular driver is defeated.

ACR Phillips II Plus 
ACR Phillips II Plus is a screw-drive design that can be driven by a #2 Phillips driver or a #2 Robertson driver, but when driven by a Phillips II Plus Bit, the combination results in a stick-fit interface.

Phillips/square 
While a standard Phillips or Robertson tool can be used, there is also a dedicated tool for it that increases the surface area between the tool and the fastener so it can handle more torque.

Recex 
The Recex drive system claims it offers the combined non-slip convenience of a Robertson drive during production assembly and Phillips for after market serviceability. The Phillips Screw Company offers both Phillips and Pozidriv combo heads with Robertson.

Slotted/Torx 
 A combined slotted and Torx drive screw was used in electronics manufacturing. For example, Compaq used this type to combine the benefits of Torx in manufacturing and the commonality of flat drive in field repair situations. The slot was closed on the ends to prevent the flat-blade tool from slipping out sideways and damaging nearby electronics.

Slotted/Square
Also known as an ECX or Combination Tip drive.  A combined slotted and Robertson drive screw found in electrical power equipment and distribution equipment.  The design allows for higher torque application with reduced camming, slipping out and damaging the fastener.

Clutch 

  There are two types of clutch screw drives: Type A and Type G. Type A, also known as a "standard clutch", resembles a bow tie, with a small circular "knot" at the center. These were common in GM automobiles, trucks and buses of the 1940s and 1950s. Type G resembles a butterfly, and lacks the center "knot". This type of screw head is commonly used in the manufacture of mobile homes and recreational vehicles. The clutch head was designed to be driven with a flat-blade screwdriver as well as a clutch driver.

Thumbscrew 

A thumbscrew is a type of screw drive with either a tall head and ridged or knurled sides, or a key-like flat-sided vertical head. They are intended to be tightened and loosened by hand, and are usually not found in structural applications. They are sometimes also cut for Phillips head or slotted screwdrivers, as well as having the knurling for finger grip. ASME Standard 18.6.8 covers dimensions for Type A (shoulder under the head), regular and heavy, along with Type B (without shoulder), regular and heavy. They can be found on many computer cases, and in other locations where easy access without tools is desired.

External drives 
External drives are characterized by a female tool and a male fastener. An advantage of external drive fasteners is that they lack a recess in the head, which can collect water, dirt, or paint, which can interfere with later insertion of a driver tool. Also, some external drives can be engaged from the side, without requiring large inline clearance for tool access, which allows their use in tight spaces such as engines or complex pipework. Because the heads must stand out from the surface they attach to, they are rarely available in countersunk or flush designs.

Square 
 A square screw drive uses four-sided fastener heads which can be turned with an adjustable wrench, open-end wrench, or 8- or 12-point sockets. Common in the 19th and early 20th centuries, when it was easier and cheaper to manufacture than most other drives, it is less common today (although still easy to find) because the external hex is now cost-competitive and allows better access for wrenching despite nearby obstructions.

Hex 

 A hex screw drive uses six-sided fastener heads, and the fastener is known as a hex head cap screw. It can be turned with an adjustable wrench, combination wrench and 6- or 12-point sockets. The hex drive is better than square drive for locations where surrounding obstacles limit wrenching access, because smaller wrench-swing arcs can still successfully rotate the fastener. Metric sizes of the hex are specified by ISO 4032 and ISO 4033, plus ISO 4035 for Jam Nuts, and ISO 4014 and ISO 4017 for hex cap screws, ISO 4018 for Hex head screws (grade c).

Slotted Hex 
 A combination slotted/hex head cap is often used for self-tapping screws for metal, where the hex head enables greater torque during the initial self-tapping installation, while allowing the convenience of a slotted screwdriver to be used for removal and reinsertion.

Pentagon 

 A pentagon screw drive uses five-sided fastener heads, and the fastener is known as a penta screw or penta bolt. It is designed to be intrinsically incompatible with many tools. Since five is an odd number, it cannot be turned by open-end or adjustable wrenches, which have parallel faces (and thus require a fastener with an even number of sides). Moreover, it cannot be turned by typical consumer- and professional-grade socket drivers, which possess either six or twelve points (neither of which are multiples of five). Penta nut security fasteners also are available, which can only be driven by specialized five-sided socket drivers. However, the security feature of this design can be bypassed by using some type of pliers if enough force is applied.

Due to the difficulty of turning these fasteners without specialized (and uncommon) five-point wrenches such as hydrant wrenches, they are commonly used for tamper resistance by public utilities on water meter covers, natural gas valves, electrical cabinets, and fire hydrants.

External Torx 
 An external Torx screw has a projecting head in the shape of a Torx screwdriver bit (instead of a standard recessed cavity); a Torx socket is used to drive it. The external "E" Torx nominal sizing does not correspond to the "T" size (for example, an E40 socket is too large to fit a T40, while an E8 Torx socket will fit a T40 Torx bit). These screws are most commonly encountered in the motor industry.

12-point 

 A 12-point screw drive uses two overlapped hexagon shapes, one rotated by 30°.  Standard 12-point hex socket bits and wrenches fit these screws.  The screw heads are typically flanged, and may fit into standard Allen hex socket cap screw counterbores molded or machined into parts to be fastened.  Compared to Allen hex sockets, the advantages of these bolts include higher torque capability and the lack of a recess to trap water.  A disadvantage is the extra cost involved in forming the heads.

Tamper-resistant types 

Most tamper-resistant screw configurations rely on the common unavailability of corresponding drivers to reduce the likelihood of widespread tampering. True tamper-proof - rather than merely resistant - screw drives include the breakaway head and one-way screw drives.

Both tamper-proof and tamper-resistant drives are commonly used in vandalism-prone areas, such as public restrooms; tamper-resistant in similar applications, and on equipment such as home electronics, to prevent easy access and thus reduce injuries and improper repairs. Recent widespread availability of assorted drive bits (including security types) minimizes this advantage, at least for some fastener types.

In addition to screw drives, various nut drives have been designed to make removal difficult without specialized tools. Proprietary examples include T-Groove, Slot-Lok, Pentagon, Tork-Nut, T-Slope and Spanner designs.

Breakaway head 
The breakaway head (also called breakoff or shear fastener) is a high-security fastener whose head breaks off during installation, during or immediately after the driving process, to leave only a smooth surface. It typically consists of a countersunk flat-head bolt, with a thin shank and hex head protruding from the flat head. The hex head is used to drive the bolt into the countersunk hole, then either a wrench or hammer is used to break the shank and hex head from the flat head, or it is driven until the driving head shears off. Either method leaves only a smooth bolt head exposed. This type of bolt is commonly used with prison door locks, automobile ignition switches, and street signs, to prevent easy removal. An alternative design leaves a low-profile button head visible after installation. In addition to breakaway bolts, breakaway nuts of similar design are available.

In non-security applications, a breakaway head fastener is sometimes used as a crude torque limiter, intended to break off at an approximate torque limit. For example, certain toilet seat fastener bolts use a breakaway plastic nut, with the driver part intended to shear at a torque high enough to prevent wobbling, while not shattering the porcelain toilet from excessive pressure. Breakaway fasteners used in a non-security application may have a second driveable surface (such as a hex head) to allow later removal or adjustment of the fastener after the initial breakaway installation.

This drive type has the disadvantage of not being as precisely controlled as can be obtained by proper use of a torque wrench; applications may still fail due to either too little torque being applied to correctly fasten the joint, or too much torque being required to shear the head, resulting in damage to the material being fastened.

Line Head and Line Recess 

   Line Head and Line Recess screw drives are Japanese systems with male, female and tamper-resistant configurations.

The fasteners are commonly called line head screws. They are also known as Gamebit screws, due to their use on some video game consoles. They are found on IBM computers, as well as Nintendo and Sega systems and their game cartridges. The female sizes are designated ALR2, ALR3, ALR4, ALR5, ALR6; the male sizes are designated with an "H" instead of an "R"; and the tamper-resistant female have a "T" at the end of the designation (e.g. ALR3T).

In Japan, the male sizes are often designated as DTC-20, DTC-27, DTC-40 (discontinued) and DTC-45 corresponding to a respective screw head size of 3.2mm, 4.6mm, 6.4mm and 7.7mm; with the size of the screw measured across the widest portion of the mating part of the head. The most common sizes in use for consumer electronics are DCT-20 and DTC-27.

One-way 

 One-way screws are special screws that can be turned only in one direction. They are sometimes called one-way clutch screws, but should not be confused with true "clutch" screws. They can be installed with a standard flat-blade screwdriver, but cannot be easily removed using standard tools. One-way screws are commonly used in commercial restroom fixtures and on vehicle registration plates, to prevent vandals from tampering with them.

One-way screws are practical only when the need for removal is unlikely. They are difficult to remove with conventional tools because the slot is designed to cause cam out when even minimal torque is applied in the direction to unscrew it. Instead, a one-way screw can be removed by drilling a hole through the head of the screw and inserting a screw extractor. Alternatively, a rotary tool with cutting disk can be used to extend the slot, the head can be gripped with locking pliers, or the screw can be removed with a pin spanner (snake-eyes driver) after drilling two holes in the slot. It can also sometimes be removed by attaching a precision drill chuck tightly to the screw head, in a manner similar to removing screws that have broken heads.

Oval 
 Some consumer appliances, such as espresso machines from Jura Elektroapparate, use a proprietary screw head with an eccentric oval to dissuade owners from servicing their own machines.

Polydrive 
 The polydrive screw drive, also known as RIBE, is spline-shaped with rounded ends in the fastener head. The tool has six flat teeth at equal spacing; the sizes are determined by the diameter of the star points. Its primary advantage over older screw drives is that it resists cam out. It is used primarily in the automotive industry in high-torque applications, such as brakes and driveshafts.

Proprietary head 
There are specialty fastener companies that make unusual, proprietary head designs, such as Slot-Lok and Avsafe. These use special circular or oval cam-shaped heads that require complementary socket drivers.

For further security, there are custom-designed fastener heads requiring matching drivers available only from the manufacturer and only supplied to registered owners, similar to keyed locks.

The Ultra-Lok, and Ultra-Lok II are some of these designs that use custom keyed drivers, which tend to be confined to industrial and institutional uses that are unavailable to the average layperson. Key-Rex screws are another design, and are used in such things as ballot boxes and bank vaults.

One example familiar to laypersons is for the attachment of wheels and spare tires of passenger vehicles to deter theft; one of the lug nuts on each wheel may require a specialized socket provided with the set of lug nuts. Similar security fasteners are also available for bicycle wheels and seats.

Security hex 

 A security hex screw drive features an extruded pin to make the fastener more tamper resistant by inserting a pin in the center of the female socket, requiring a tool with a corresponding hole to drive the fastener. This can also prevent attempts at turning the screw with a small flat-bladed screwdriver.

Security Torx 

 A security Torx screw drive is a common modification to socket and cruciform style drives to make the fastener more tamper resistant by inserting a pin in the center of the female socket, requiring a tool with a corresponding hole to drive the fastener. This can also prevent attempts at turning the screw with a small flat-bladed screwdriver.

Spanner 
   The spanner or Snake-Eyes (trademarked) screw drive uses two round holes (sometimes two slots; the same driver bits work in both types) opposite each other and is designed to prevent tampering. Other informal names include pig nose, drilled head or twin hole. This type is often seen in elevators and restrooms in the United States, the London Underground in the United Kingdom, some train wagons and the Montreal Metro in Montreal, Quebec, and is seen in all Panama Metro wagons. The driving tool is called a "spanner driver" or "spanner screwdriver" in the US, and a "pin spanner" in the UK. They are also often used for soft spikes on golf shoes.  The US military's M17 and M18 service pistols (variants of the SIG Sauer P320) use spanner screws to dissuade disassembly of the handgun beyond normal field maintenance except by the authorized armorer, they have also been used previously for reinforcement screws on the M14 in order to secure the front locking tab on the magazine well, and are commonly found on the recoil lug of surplus rifles.

The knife and gun manufacturer Microtech uses a variation of this with 3 round holes arranged in a triangle shape. The camera company Leica Camera has used versions of this on rewind knobs and other levers on their rangefinder cameras.

12-spline flange 
 The 12-spline flange screw drive has twelve splines in the fastener and tool. It consists of 12 equally spaced protrusions, each with a 60° angle. It is achieved overlaying 4 equilateral triangles, each one rotated 30° over the previous one. The spline drive was part of the obsolete, U.S-designed Optimum Metric Fastener System and was defined by ASTM B18.2.7.1M, which was withdrawn in 2011, making the spline drive obsolescent.

Spline drives were specified for 5, 6.3, 8, 10, 12, 14, 16, and 20 mm size screws. Its primary advantage is its ability to resist cam out, so it is used in high-torque applications, such as tamper-proof lug nuts, cylinder head bolts, and other engine bolts.

Care should be taken not to confuse the name of this pattern with the casual phrase "spline head" which usually refers to the XZN pattern.

Torq-set 

 Torq-set is a cruciform screw drive used in torque-sensitive applications. The Torq-set head is similar in appearance to a Phillips drive in that it has a cross with 4 arms. In Torq-set however, the lines are offset from each other, so they do not align to form intersecting slots across the top of the head. Because of this, a regular Phillips or flat-blade screwdriver will not fit the head. It is used in military and aerospace applications. For example, the E-3, P-3, F-16, Airbus, Embraer, and Bombardier Inc. aircraft. Phillips Screw Company owns the name and produces the fasteners.

The applicable standards that govern the Torq-set geometry are National Aerospace Standard NASM 33781 and NASM 14191 for the ribbed version. The ribbed version is also known as ACR Torq-set.

Tri-angle 
 The TA is a type of screw drive that uses a triangle-shaped recess in the screw head. This drive can restrict access to the device internals but can readily be driven with hex keys. These screws are often found in children's toys from fast food restaurants, as well as vacuum cleaners, fan heaters, elevators, camping stoves, golf clubs, Breville kettles and Master Locks, among others, Sizes include TA14, TA18, TA20, TA23 and TA27. Note that the sides of the triangle are straight, which differs from Tri-point-3 fasteners.

Tri-point 
 The TP (or Y-type) security screw drive is similar to the Phillips screw head, but with three points rather than four. These specialized screws are usually used on electronics equipment, including some Nintendo handheld hardware, Sanyo and Kyocera cellular telephones, and Fuji digital cameras.

Apple uses Y-type screws to secure the battery on the 2010 and 2011 MacBook Pro, as well as an extremely small type in the Apple Watch, iPhone 7 and iPhone X.  This style of screw is often called a "tri-wing", although that name more properly belongs to a different design (see below).

Tri-point-3 

 TP3 (sometimes referred to as tri-lobe or tri-lobular) uses a Reuleaux triangle-shaped recess in the screw head, to make it semi-secure because it cannot be driven by a flat-blade screwdriver and is not readily driven, as Tri-angle is, by hex keys. It is used on fast food promotional toys and video games, die-cast toys, and some Roomba battery packs. There are four sizes: A = 2 mm, 2.3 mm, 2.7 mm, and 3.2 mm.

Tri-groove 
 Tri-groove or T-groove is a design for a security screw with a flat-topped conical head and three short radial slots that do not join in the center.

Tri-wing 

 The tri-wing, also known as triangular slotted, is a screw with three slotted "wings" and a small triangular hole in the center. Unlike the "tri-point" fastener, the slots are offset, and do not intersect the center of the fastener. A version with left-hand threads is called an Opsit screw, where unscrewing can be done by turning the screwdriver clockwise, which is the opposite of tri-wing and regular screws.

The design was adopted by some parts of the aerospace industry, led by Lockheed in the early 1970s on the L-1011, but met with mixed results due to complaints of insert damage during installation. McDonnell Douglas also used this as a primary fastener on its commercial aircraft. British Aerospace and Airbus are also users of this fastener.

Other types 
A U-drive screw has a helical thread with an angle acute enough to be driven by a hammer or pressure from an arbor press, and thus has a domed head with no means of turning it. These are most frequently driven into plastic.

See also 
 Mechanical joint
 Wrench

References

Further reading

External links 
 Spanner Jaw Sizes
 Security Fasteners at the University of Wyoming, featuring an extensive list of fastener insert designs
 When a Phillips is not a Phillips
 When a Phillips is Not a Phillips Plus So Much More!
 Screw Drive Systems

Mechanical standards
Screws
Screw drives